is a  town located in Sorachi Subprefecture, Hokkaido, Japan.

As of September 2016, the town has an estimated population of 1,983, and a density of 19.5 persons per km2. The total area is 101.08 km2.

Culture

Mascot

She is a wine barrel. Due to this, she wears make up to hide cracks. She is known for saying "my blood is flowing with wine!" (私の血はワインが流れている！).

References

External links
Official Website 

Towns in Hokkaido